Dattadevi was the wife and chief consort of the Gupta emperor Samudragupta. She was the mother of Samudragupta's successor, Chandragupta II, She was most probably married to Samudragupta during his educational career. Harisena, Samudragupta's court poet and close friend, played an important role in the marriage of Samudragupta to Dattadevi. She is described as a "virtous and faithful wife" in an Eran inscription.

References

Gupta Empire
4th-century Indian people